is a Japanese football player. He plays for YSCC Yokohama.

Career
Hiroya Iwakabe joined the J3 League club YSCC Yokohama in 2017.

References

External links

1994 births
Living people
Tokai University alumni
Association football people from Kanagawa Prefecture
Japanese footballers
J3 League players
YSCC Yokohama players
Association football defenders